Shirley Rector (1951 – 2004) was an American politician who served as a member of the Washington House of Representatives for one term from 1989 to 1991.  She represented Washington's 5th legislative district as a Democrat.  In party leadership, she was vice chair of the state Democratic Central Committee.  She died in Spokane in 2004.

References

1951 births
2004 deaths
Democratic Party members of the Washington House of Representatives
Women state legislators in Washington (state)